The Fronalpstock is a mountain in Switzerland, in the Schwyzer Alps and the canton of Schwyz. The summit is accessible by a chair lift from the village of Stoos.

See also
List of mountains of Switzerland accessible by public transport

References

External links

 Fronalpstock myswitzerland.com
 Fronalpstock on Hikr

Mountains of Switzerland
Mountains of the Alps
Cable cars in Switzerland
Mountains of the canton of Schwyz